Jalali may refer to:

People
 Jalali (surname)

Places
 Jalali, Uttar Pradesh, a town and a nagar panchayat in Aligarh district in the state of Uttar Pradesh, India
 Jalali, Uttarakhand, a small town situated in Almora district in the state of Uttarakhand, India
 Jalali, Hormozgan, a village in Hormozgan Province, Iran
 Jalali, Razavi Khorasan, a village in Razavi Khorasan Province, Iran
 Jalali, alternate name of Jalalieh, Razavi Khorasan, a village in Razavi Khorasan Province, Iran

Other uses
 Jalali calendar, an Iranian calendar
 Jalali (Kurdish tribe), a tribe of Eastern Turkey and Northwestern Iran
 Celali rebellions, in the Ottoman Empire